Prexasertib (LY2606368) is a small molecule checkpoint kinase inhibitor, mainly active against CHEK1, with minor activity against CHEK2. This causes induction of DNA double-strand breaks resulting in apoptosis. It was developed by Eli Lilly but the company announced in 2019 it was dropping prexasertib from active development, although clinical trials continue.  Research continues into the efficacy of prexasertib in treatment of
acute myeloid leukemia, myelodysplastic syndrome, rhabdomyosarcoma, and medulloblastoma.

References 

Experimental cancer drugs
Protein kinase inhibitors
Pyrazoles
Pyrimidines
Nitriles